Vot Tande  is an uninhabited islet of the Banks Islands of northern Vanuatu. It is located about  due north of the island of Mota Lava. The islet of Vot Tande has never been inhabited. It is host to thousands of sea birds—especially frigatebirds, which have given their name to the islet. It consists of two islands. The highest point of either of the islands is 64 meters above sea level.

Geography
The island is 800 m long and 300 m wide; its area is 0.24 km2. At the northern end there is a wave cut platform being exposed at low tide and extends 100 m seawards. The latitude is 13.25º S, and the longitude is 167.65º E. The island frequently has cyclones and earthquakes.

Name 
The islet is known under various names, depending on which vernacular language is used. 
In all languages of the region, the meaning is the same: “the Rock of Frigatebirds”. Its reconstructed Proto-Torres-Banks name, based on the attested names below, is *βatu [ta]ɣaⁿdai, where *βatu means "stone" and *[ta]ɣaⁿdai means "frigatebird".
 In Löyöp (Ureparapara), it is called Vot Tade , with prenasalised 
 In Mwotlap (Mota Lava), it is known as Nevet Men Tagde , or under its older name Vet Tagde .
 In Mota, it is called Vat Ganai 

The spelling Vot Tande is a transcription of the Löyöp form. The variant Vetaoundé, which is found on old French maps, reflects an earlier attempt at spelling the older Mwotlap form. Other misspellings for the same islet include Vet Tande, Vot Ganai.

References

Uninhabited islands of Vanuatu
Torba Province